The 2019 Canada Sevens was the fourth edition of the Canada Sevens tournament, and the sixth tournament of the 2018–19 World Rugby Sevens Series. The tournament was played on 9–10 March at BC Place in Vancouver.

Format
The teams are drawn into four pools of four teams each. Each team plays every other team in their pool once. The top two teams from each pool advance to the Cup bracket where teams compete for the Gold, Silver, and Bronze Medals. The bottom two teams from each group go to the Challenge Trophy bracket.

Teams
Fifteen core teams played in the tournament along with one invitational team, the winner of the 2019 Sudamérica Rugby Sevens, Chile:

Pool stage
All times in Pacific Standard Time (UTC−08:00).

Pool A

Pool B

Pool C

Pool D

Knockout stage
All times in Pacific Daylight Time (UTC−07:00).

Thirteenth Place

Challenge Trophy

5th Place

Cup

Tournament placings

Source: World Rugby

Players

Scoring leaders

Source: World Rugby

Dream Team
The following seven players were selected to the tournament Dream Team at the conclusion of the tournament:

References

External links
Tournament page
World Rugby page

Canada Sevens
Canada
Canada Sevens
Canada Sevens
Canada Sevens